Varalaru Mukkiyam is a 2022 Indian Tamil-language romantic comedy drama film written and directed by Santhosh Rajan in his directorial debut and produced by R. B. Choudary  through the company Super Good Films. The films stars  his son Jiiva, Kashmira Pardeshi and Pragya Nagra in lead roles. The film's music and score is composed by Shaan Rahman with cinematography handled by Sakthi Saravanan and editing done by N. B. Srikanth.

The film was shot extensively across Tamil Nadu including Chennai and Coimbatore, Hyderabad and Telangana and the final schedule was filmed in Kerala. The film was released in theatres on 9 December 2022. The film received mostly negative reviews from critics and became an box office bomb.

Synopsis
A wayward young man's life is turned on its head when he begins to doggedly pursue the daughter of the new family in his neighborhood.

Cast

 Jiiva as Karthik Gopal
 Kashmira Pardeshi as Yamuna (Voice dubbed by Raveena Ravi)
 Pragya Nagra as Jamuna
 VTV Ganesh as Adaikalam
 K. S. Ravikumar as Gopal, Karthik's father
 Motta Rajendran as Chris Gayle
 Viji Ratheesh
 Siddique as Velayudhan Kutty,Yamuna and Jamuna's father 
 Saranya Ponvannan as Malar, Karthik's mother 
 Sha Ra
 TSK
 E. Ramdoss as Karthik's grandfather
 Swaminathan
 Lollu Sabha Manohar
 Kali Rajkumar
 Aadhirai Soundarajan as Kavitha, Karthi's sister

Production
The film was tentatively titled as Jiiva37. On January 4, 2022, the film's official title was unveiled as Varalaru Mukkiyam. Post-production of the film worked in progress on 4 January 2022.

Music

Shaan Rahman composed the soundtrack and background score of the film while collaborating with actor Jiiva and director Santhosh Rajan for the first time. The first single "Pothi Pothi Valatha Pulla" was released on 10 June 2022. The audio rights were acquired by Saregama. The second single "Mallu Girl" was released on 8 July 2022. The third single "Vela Kedachiruchu" was released on 5 August 2022. The fourth single titled "Suthura Boomi" was released on 30 November 2022.

Release

Theatrical 
The film was released in theatres on 9 December 2022. Initially, it was scheduled for a release on 2 December 2022 however, the release date was postponed. The trailer of the film was released on 27 November 2022.

Home media
The post-theatrical streaming rights of the film was bought by Netflix.  Satellite Rights of this film was bought by Zee Tamil.

Reception
M. Suganth of The Times of India gave the film 1 out of 5 stars and wrote "You feel like telling him, Varalaaru mukkiyam, but script selection adha vida mukkiyam". Vignesh Madhu of Cinema Express gave the film 1.5 out of 5 stars and wrote "Varalaru Mukkiyam is a needless reminder of the times when senseless, absurd films were brandished as trendy comedies. A throwback to that era isn't that important a history to revisit". A critic for The Indian Express wrote "And except for a few 18+ verses, it would have been a family-friendly film.  Overall, though there are some ups and downs, it's a decently entertaining movie that's fun to watch and history matters". A critic for India Herald wrote "Jiiva keeps putting his all into scripts that he shouldn't have chosen in the first place, much like someone who fervently keeps polishing a piece of rock without realising that it is not a diamond". Ashik A of Samayam Tamil wrote that "Although the story is already seen and used to, it has earned pass marks as an entertaining film that does not fight with comedy scenes".  A critic from Dinamalar rated the film 2.5 out of 5 stars.

References

External links
 

Indian romantic comedy-drama films
2022 films
2022 romantic comedy-drama films
2020s Tamil-language films
2022 directorial debut films
Super Good Films films